The Evangelical Church Alliance International ("ECA") is an inter-denominational association of Christian ministers that exists to share the Gospel throughout the world.

Its official website asserts that it provides credentials to "pastors, teachers, para church leaders, missionaries, evangelists, speakers, youth workers, professors, military chaplains, and fire, industrial, hospice, police, and prison chaplains, to name a few". 

The ECA is associated with the National Association of Evangelicals and the Evangelical Council for Financial Accountability.

History
The ECA was established in 1887 by the Reverend C.S. Hanley in Shenadoah, Iowa, as the World's Faith Missionary Association (WFMA).

As with similar organizations of such an age, the ECA has scant documentary history. However, a letter from C.S. Hanley's wife Minnie still exists, which provides some evidence of the initial vision of the organisation. 
"My darling husband truly had a world vision of bringing Christian leadership into harmonious relation to each other. . . The World's Faith Missionary Association was organized and equipped for this purpose."

Soon after the death of C.S. Hanley, a decision was made by the board of WFMA to divest the organisation. However, the WFMA was re-established in two locations by separate groups within the organization. Each claimed the support of Mrs. Hanley.

Rev. C.S. Osterhus organized the WFMA in Robbinsdale, Minnesota, while another portion of membership under the leadership of Dr. Montgomery organized in Webster Groves, Missouri. In the case of the latter, the name "Fundamental Ministerial Association" was chosen in 1931 to reflect the organization's basis of unity and to distinguish the organization from the WFMA in Minnesota.

On July 21, 1958, during the annual convention at Trinity Seminary and Bible College in Chicago, Illinois, a more comprehensive constitution was created and the name was changed to The Evangelical Church Alliance.

The ECA's membership includes over 1,600+ constituents. Today the ECA's motto continues to be, "In things essential, unity; in things nonessential, liberty; and in all things, charity", and remains committed to the Word of God and to its members who minister throughout the world.

Current leadership
Rev., Dr. Robert H. Turrill,  President and CEO,
Rev., Elmon R. Krupnik, Ph.D., Military Chaplain Commission Chairman

See also
Evangelicalism
Parachurch organization
Interdenominational

External links
The Evangelical Church Alliance official website

Evangelicalism
Evangelical parachurch organizations